Aliso Niguel High School (ANHS), which is part of the Capistrano Unified School District, is located in the city of Aliso Viejo, California.  Most of its students reside in the communities of Aliso Viejo and Laguna Niguel. The school is a California Distinguished School, a National Blue Ribbon School, and a New American High School. Aliso Niguel was ranked as number 252 in Newsweek's 2016 list of the top 500 high schools in the nation.

History
Opening its doors in 1993 with a student body of 1600, ANHS became the fourth high school in the Capistrano Unified School District. With the implementation of Digital High School grant in 2000, Aliso Niguel High School invested over $1 million in new technology and related instruction. Additionally, all teachers have e-mail addresses and web sites for swift communication with parents. Organized parent involvement takes the form of an active PTSA and a wide range of parent booster organizations.

In 1996, Aliso Niguel was selected as a California Distinguished School, the youngest school ever to be recognized as such by the State Department of Education. In 2000, Aliso Niguel High School received national recognition as a Blue Ribbon School and New American High School. In 2004, The Western Association of Schools and Colleges granted Aliso Niguel a six-year term of accreditation, which it renewed for an additional six-year period in 2010, and again in 2016. In 2020, the school was again recognized as a California Distinguished School.

Facilities
Although the high school started small (with about 1,400 students) in their first year, the high
school grew rapidly over the years, and it still continues to grow to this present day. The campus also includes a stadium, Wolverine Stadium, with a track and multipurpose field. Wolverine Stadium, which opened in 1994, seats 2,675 people, it includes a visitor side and a larger home side for seating.

Academics
In 2005, the school's students scored within the top 90% of all schools on the California High School Exit Exam. 90% of all students that took the English Language Arts passed, and 91% passed in the Math section.

Sports
Aliso Niguel's sports teams are known as the Wolverines and compete in the Sea View League and South Coast League of the California Interscholastic Federation's Southern Section. From 1998 to 2005, they were members of the Sea View League, and in the Pacific Coast League (California) before 1998.

In 1996, the Aliso Niguel Varsity Football team went undefeated and won the CIF-SS Division VIII championship.

In 2005, The Aliso Niguel Boys Basketball team won the CIF-Southern Section Division I-A championship.

In 2012, the Aliso Niguel Girls Soccer team won the CIF Southern Section Division 1 championship. They were also named National Champions by ESPN and MaxPreps.

In 2014, the Aliso Niguel Girls Volleyball team won the CIF Southern Section championship.

Fine and practical arts

Marching band
The Aliso Niguel marching band is a part of the Western Band Association, and has performed in four marching competitions plus participate in the WBA finals. The marching band won the title of 1st place for the 3A 2008 WBA Championships. The title for winning first is called Grand Champions. 

 

They most recently received a bronze medal in 3rd place for the 2021 SCSBOA 3A Championships with a score of around 84.6 give or take. They also received the award for High Percussion with a score of 85 and the award for High Auxiliary with a score of [more info needed].

Newspaper 
The Growling Wolverine first picked up the pen in 1993, but expanded digitally in 2020.

Notable alumni

 Sasha Cohen, Olympic silver medalist figure skater
 Josh Partington, lead guitarist for Something Corporate
 Kathryn Plummer, volleyball player for NCAA Tournament champions Stanford in 2016, 2018, 2019, current pro player for Vero Volley Monza
 Sammy Jo Prudhomme, professional soccer player
 Grant Ginder, author of The People We Hate at the Wedding
 Michael Roll, professional basketball player
 Robb MacLean, guitar and lead vocals for Limbeck
 Patrick Carrie, guitar and backing vocals for Limbeck
 Kyla Ross, Olympic gold medalist gymnast
 Marco Morante, fashion designer and contestant on Netflix's Next in Fashion
 Skip Schumaker, former Major League Baseball outfielder and second baseman and current manager of the Miami Marlins
 Zaneta Wyne, professional soccer player English Women's Super League
 Julian Jones, assistant and "Babysitter to the Stars" for the Maloof Family
 Nicky Youre, singer and songwriter

References

External links

 

High schools in Orange County, California
Aliso Viejo, California
Laguna Niguel, California
Public high schools in California
Educational institutions established in 1993
1993 establishments in California